Arthur Booth may refer to:

 Arthur Booth (cricketer, born 1902) (1902–1974), English cricketer
 Arthur Booth (cricketer, born 1926) (1926–2004), English cricketer
 Arthur Booth (cartoonist) (1892–1926), Irish cartoonist
 Juini Booth (Arthur Edward Booth, 1948–2021), American jazz double-bassist

See also
 Arthur Booth-Clibborn (1855–1939), Salvation Army officer